Vălani or Vălanii may refer to one of two villages in Bihor County, Romania:

 Vălani de Pomezeu, a village in Pomezeu Commune
 Vălanii de Beiuș, a village in Uileacu de Beiuș Commune